Hot Brass is an album by saxophonist Ricky Ford, recorded in 1991 and released on the Candid label.

Reception

The Toronto Star wrote that Ford "heads a septet that plays with the furious power of a big band, often employing three- and four-part harmonies on his eight strong compositions." The AllMusic review by Ron Wynn stated: "Nice session matching tenor saxophone standout Ricky Ford with crew of fiery trumpet and trombone players ... Ford was a young lion back in the '70s, when there was no hype. He's now an experienced, skilled veteran."

Track listing
All compositions by Ricky Ford except where noted
 "Ford Variations" – 3:35
 "Banging, Bashing, Bowing and Blowing" – 5:48
 "A Night in Valencia" – 7:11
 "11/15/91" – 5:50
 "Cop Out" (Duke Ellington) – 3:33
 "Hot Brass" – 8:16
 "Mood Blues" – 7:25
 "Speak Now" – 6:42
 "Carbon 14" – 7:32
 "It Don't Mean a Thing (If It Ain't Got That Swing)" (Ellington, Irving Mills) – 2:28

Personnel
Ricky Ford - tenor saxophone, alto saxophone
Lew Soloff, Claudio Roditi – trumpet 
Steve Turre – trombone
Danilo Pérez – piano 
Christian McBride – bass 
Carl Allen – drums

References

Candid Records albums
Ricky Ford albums
1992 albums